Vargas Swamp Lancers, or Monument to the Lancers, is a large sculptural complex realized by Colombian artist Rodrigo Arenas Betancourt and by engineer Guillermo Gonzalez Zuleta in the department of Boyacá (Colombia) as a memorial for the Battle of Vargas Swamp. It is the largest monument in Colombia.

This monument depicts the attack of the 14 lancers commanded by Colonel Juan José Rondón.  It is 33 m high and was dedicated in the 150th anniversary of the Colombian Declaration of Independence (1970).

The Lancers 
In July 1819, while marching against Santafé, the Republican army of Simón Bolívar, exhausted after passing across the Pisba paramount, faced a Spanish regular army commanded by General José María Barreiro. Bolivar's forces included the cavalry regiment Llano Arriba armed with lances.

The terrain was better suited for the Spanish troops, and Bolívar's army faced adverse odds. After initial clashes between the infantry of both sides, the Spanish cavalry attempted a flanking attack on the republicans. At this moment Colonel Rondón's small detachment of 14 lancers charged General Barreiro's horsemen at a point where the Spanish regulars were crowded onto a narrow track through swampland. This sudden counter-attack by the lancers of the Llano Arriba regiment, as portrayed in the sculpture, was a decisive point in the winning of the battle. Bolívar's main force moved up in support of the lancers and Barreiro's army, after suffering 500 casualties, fell back covered by the 2nd Numanicia Battalion as a rearguard.

The monument 
The monument designed by Arenas Betancourt and Colombian engineer Guillermo Gonzalez Zuleta, is a bronze sculpture, depicting the 14 soldiers and their horses, suspended in the air and framed in a concrete sculpture.

References

External links 
  Colarte
  Pantano de Vargas

History of Colombia
Monuments and memorials in Colombia
Landmarks in Colombia
1970 sculptures
Buildings and structures in Boyacá Department
Tourist attractions in Boyacá Department
Monuments of Colombia